Emmanuel "Emma" Lucenti (born 23 November 1984) is a judoka from Argentina.  He competed at the 2008, 2012 and 2016 Summer Olympics in the men's half-middleweight (-81 kg).  At the 2008 Summer Olympics, he lost in second round to Euan Burton.  At the 2012 Summer Olympics, he reached the quarter-finals, where he lost to Kim Jae-bum.  As Kim continued on to the gold medal match, Lucenti took part in the bronze medal repechage, where he lost in the first round to Antoine Valois-Fortier. At the 2016 Summer Olympics, Lucenti was once again eliminated by Valois-Fortier, this time in the third round.

He qualified to represent Argentina at the 2020 Summer Olympics.

His older brother Rodrigo was also an Olympic judoka, competing in the lightweight (-73 kg) category.

References 

 JudoInside
 Facebook

External links
 
 
 

Argentine male judoka
Living people
1984 births
Argentine people of Italian descent
Pan American Games bronze medalists for Argentina
Judoka at the 2011 Pan American Games
Judoka at the 2008 Summer Olympics
Judoka at the 2012 Summer Olympics
Judoka at the 2016 Summer Olympics
Olympic judoka of Argentina
Pan American Games medalists in judo
Judoka at the 2015 Pan American Games
South American Games gold medalists for Argentina
South American Games bronze medalists for Argentina
South American Games medalists in judo
Competitors at the 2006 South American Games
Medalists at the 2011 Pan American Games
Judoka at the 2020 Summer Olympics
Sportspeople from San Miguel de Tucumán